William Harold Leonard Walker  (born ) is a politician in Ontario, Canada. He was a Progressive Conservative member of the Legislative Assembly of Ontario who represented the riding of Bruce—Grey—Owen Sound between 2011 and 2022.

Background
Walker was born and raised in Hepworth, Ontario. He was an executive in the health-care industry and also worked for Bruce Power.

Politics
Walker ran in the 2011 provincial election as the Progressive Conservative candidate in the riding of Bruce—Grey—Owen Sound. He defeated Liberal candidate Kevin Eccles by 8,678 votes. He was re-elected in the 2014 provincial election defeating Liberal candidate Ellen Anderson by 8,864 votes.

He served as the party's critic for Community and Social Services.

On July 6, 2018, he was appointed Chief Government Whip.

References

External links

1966 births
Living people
Members of the Executive Council of Ontario
Progressive Conservative Party of Ontario MPPs
21st-century Canadian politicians